
Kyffin is a name, which is used as a given name, surname or part of a double-barrelled surname. It may refer to:

Surname

Single
Morris Kyffin (c.1555–1598), Welsh author and soldier

Double

Austin Kyffin-Taylor (1858–1955), British Conservative Party politician
Gerald Kyffin-Taylor (1863–1949), British soldier and politician
William Francis Kyffin Taylor, 1st Baron Maenan (1854–1951), English barrister and judge
Evan Kyffin Thomas (1866–1935), newspaper proprietor of the South Australian Register, son of William
Robert Kyffin Thomas (1851-1910), newspaper proprietor of the South Australian Register, son of William
William Kyffin Thomas (1821–1878), editor newspaper proprietor of the South Australian Register,

Given name
Kyffin Williams (1918-2006), Welsh landscape painter

See also
Mount Kyffin, Antarctica, named after Evan Kyffin-Thomas